Carpatolechia deogyusanae is a moth of the family Gelechiidae. It is found in South Korea.

The wingspan is 9-12.5 mm. The species can be distinguished by the well developed yellow patch at the middle of the cell and several dark fuscous scale tufts. The hindwings are grey.

The larvae feed on Quercus species.

References

Moths described in 1992
Carpatolechia
Moths of Korea